Out of Season is a studio album by vocalist Beth Gibbons (of Portishead)  and bassist Paul Webb (under the pseudonym Rustin Man, formerly of Talk Talk). It was released on 28 October 2002 in the United Kingdom and on 7 October 2003 in the United States. Out of Season is largely a folk album with jazz leanings, with Gibbons and Webb drawing more directly on the influences of Nina Simone, Billie Holiday, and Nick Drake, at which Portishead's work in trip hop only hinted. Out of Season also features contributions from Gibbons' fellow Portishead bandmate Adrian Utley and Webb's former bandmate Lee Harris. The first track of the album, "Mysteries", appears on the original soundtrack of the French movie Les Poupées Russes (The Russian Dolls), and in Wim Wenders' Palermo Shooting from 2008. The album achieved a silver certification from the BPI.

Track listing
All songs written by Beth Gibbons and Paul Webb, except where noted otherwise.
"Mysteries" – 4:39
"Tom the Model" – 3:41
"Show" (Gibbons) – 4:26
"Romance" – 5:09
"Sand River" (Webb) – 3:48
"Spider Monkey" – 4:10
"Resolve" – 2:51
"Drake" – 3:54
"Funny Time of Year" – 6:48
"Rustin Man" – 4:20
American edition bonus track
"Candy Says" (live) (Lou Reed) – 5:20

Charts
The album charted in some countries, peaking at #28 in the UK, #13 in Germany, #36 in Switzerland, #54 in Austria, #19 in France, #77 in Netherlands, #6 in Norway and #39 in Denmark.
"Tom the Model" was released as a single on March 3, 2003, and reached #70 in the UK. A video for the song was directed by Chris Bran and it featured Gibbons performing in front of a theatre crowd.
Re-released in October 2019 on vinyl and entered the British charts at #24

Personnel
Musicians
Beth Gibbons – acoustic guitar, arrangements, vocals, vocoder
Paul Webb – percussion, piano, accordion, arrangements, electric guitar, keyboards, backing vocals
Rebecca Lublinski - flute
Rachel Samuel - cello
John Baggott – piano, Wurlitzer
Gary Baldwin – organ
John Barclay – flugelhorn
Martyn Barker – percussion, conga
Mark Berrow – violin
Rachael Brown – backing vocals
Lurine Cato – backing vocals
Ben Chappell – cello
Clive Deamer – drums, tympani
Philip Dukes – viola
Simon Edwards – bass guitar, double bass
Mark Feltham – harmonica
Andrew Findon – alto flute
Pete Glenister – acoustic guitar
Leo Green – horn Section
Lee Harris – drums
Nick Ingman – conductor, orchestration
Mitchell John – backing vocals
Patrick Kiernan – violin
Boguslaw Kostecki – violin
Peter Lale – viola
Martin Loveday – cello
Neill MacColl – acoustic guitar, Ebow
Perry Mason – violin
Lorraine McIntosh – backing vocals
Frank Ricotti – vibraphone
Eddie Roberts – violin
Nina Robertson – alto flute
Joy Rose – backing vocals
Mary Scully – double bass
Chris Tombling – violin
Jonathan Tunnell – cello
Adrian Utley – organ, acoustic guitar, bass, guitar, electric guitar, Moog synthesizer, Ebow, baritone guitar
Bruce White – viola
Dave Woodcock – violin
Gavyn Wright – violin
Warren Zielinski – violin

Production
Frank Arkwright – mastering
Ryan Art – design
Mark Bishop – mixing assistant, assistant
Phill Brown – engineer, mixing
Peter Dickinson – photography
Niven Garland – engineer
Beth Gibbons – producer, engineer
Andy Montgomery – engineer
Neil Perry – engineer
Albert Pinheiro – assistant
Adrian Utley – additional production, engineer, effects
Eva Vermandel – photography
Paul Webb – producer, mixing, effects

References

2002 debut albums
Beth Gibbons albums
Paul Webb albums
Sanctuary Records albums
Go! Discs albums